Towers... is the debut EP by the band Burning Witch. It was recorded by renowned indie producer Steve Albini. It was available as a part of the compilation album Crippled Lucifer (Seven Psalms for Our Lord of Light) and has since been re-released as a 2 disc set Crippled Lucifer (Ten Psalms for Our Lord of Light), through Southern Lord Records.

Track listing
 "Sacred Predictions" – 7:01
 "Country Doctor" – 10:16
 "Tower Place" – 5:26
 "Sea Hag" – 14:09

Personnel
Stephen O'Malley – guitar
G. Stuart Dahlguist – bass
Jamie Sykes – drums
Edgy 59 – vocals

References

1998 debut EPs
Burning Witch albums
Southern Lord Records EPs
Albums produced by Steve Albini